Tim Lindsey (born September 15th, 1983) is a former American football long snapper who is currently a fitness trainer. Lindsey played college football at West Virginia.

College
At WVU he was the best long snapper in the Big East and a stalwart for the Mountaineer special teams. From 2003-07 he was on Athletic Director's academic honor roll. In 2006, he was awarded a full athletic scholarship. In 2006 and 2007 he was on the All-Big East Academic Team. He was a team leader in the weight room, setting position lifting records and he was voted one of the four permanent team captains for 2007 at the Gator Bowl.

Football career
In 2007, he attended the Redskins mini-camp and later signed as an undrafted free agent by the Atlanta Falcons. In 2008 Lindsey was signed by the Seattle Seahawks (released August 28, 2008) and was outstanding in the pre-season. He had nine perfect snaps including the game-winning field goal in overtime against the Bears in Week 2 and played two pre-season games. In 2010, Lindsey was signed by the UFL Hartford Colonials and participated in the team's early mini-camp. He was later released in favor of Jared Retkofsky, who had snapped the previous year for the franchise (New York Sentinels). Retkofsky had just been released by the Pittsburgh Steelers (June 9, 2010) with whom he played nine games in the 2009 NFL season.

Awards
In 2006, he received the Coaches Contribution Award. That year, he was also the winner of the Tom Nickolich Memorial Award for outstanding achievement by a walk-on in the Mountaineer football program. In 2007, he received the Ira E. Rodgers Award presented to the player who has shown high leadership and academic qualities as well as football performance.

References

External links
Seattle Seahawks bio
NFL all time roster
 WVU Top award for Lindsey
Big East All Academic Team
Tim Lindsey WVU Team Capt.
 Lindsey Top Snapper in Big East

1983 births
Living people
People from Bridgeport, West Virginia
American football long snappers
West Virginia Mountaineers football players
Washington Redskins players
Atlanta Falcons players
Seattle Seahawks players
Hartford Colonials players
Players of American football from West Virginia